Boris Komotsky (born 31 January 1956, Potsdam, East Germany) is a Russian political figure, editor of the Pravda newspaper and a deputy of the 6th and 8th Russian State Dumas.
 
From 1978 to 1990, Komotsky taught scientific communism. In 1990, he participated in the creation and then the work of the press center of the Supreme Soviet of Russia. He is one of the founders of the Center for Research of Political Culture of Russia. In March 1996, he joined the group of consultants and speechwriters of the chairman of the Central Committee of the Communist Party of the Russian Federation Gennady Zyuganov. From 2005 to 2009, he was the Deputy Chief Editor of the Pravda newspaper; in 2009 he was appointed to the post of editor, which he still holds. From 2011 to 2016, he was the deputy of the 6th State Duma. In 2021, he was re-elected for the 8th State Duma.

References

 

1956 births
Living people
Communist Party of the Russian Federation members
21st-century Russian politicians
Eighth convocation members of the State Duma (Russian Federation)
Sixth convocation members of the State Duma (Russian Federation)
People from Potsdam